A list of films produced in Italy in 1928 (see 1928 in film):

See also
List of Italian films of 1927
List of Italian films of 1929

External links
 Italian films of 1928 at the Internet Movie Database

Lists of 1928 films by country or language
1928
Films